Epimedium acuminatum, called the acuminate barrenwort, is a species of flowering plant in the genus Epimedium, native to south-central and southeast China. It has gained the Royal Horticultural Society's Award of Garden Merit.

References

acuminatum
Endemic flora of China
Flora of South-Central China
Flora of Southeast China
Plants described in 1886